Hohenzollerndamm is a station in the Wilmersdorf district of Berlin. The station is located on the eponymous street named after the House of Hohenzollern. The neo-baroque entrance hall reminiscent of Art Nouveau design was erected in 1910.

References

External links

Berlin S-Bahn stations
Buildings and structures in Charlottenburg-Wilmersdorf
Art Nouveau architecture in Berlin
Railway stations in Germany opened in 1910
Art Nouveau railway stations